Where the Hell is Matt? is an Internet phenomenon that features a video of Dancing Matt (Matt Harding) doing a dance "jig" in  many different places around the world in 2005. The video garnered popularity on the video sharing site YouTube. There are now five major videos plus two outtakes and several background videos on YouTube.  Matt dances alone in the first videos.  In 2008 others join with him doing the dance "jig"; in 2010 he does the Diski Dance in South Africa.  In 2012 he works with other dancers, sometimes using a local dance or another dance step.

While working in Australia for Activision on the project All Humans Must Die, Harding claimed that: "My life had become this rhythmic migration from bubble to bubble. You wake up in your apartment bubble, you get in your car bubble, you go to your work bubble, you get in your car, and then you go to you know, whatever, the outdoor shopping plaza bubble, back in your car bubble, back in your apartment bubble. There wasn’t a lot of exposure to the outside world … it’s really insulating." Quitting his job he traveled the world from 2003 to 2004, known by his friends for a particular dance, and while video recording each other in Vietnam in May 2003, his travel companions suggested he add the dance. The videos were uploaded to his website for friends and family to enjoy. After completing a second journey to Africa in 2004, Harding edited together 15 dance scenes, all with him center frame, with the background music "Sweet Lullaby" by Deep Forest. The original song uses samples from a dying Solomon Islands language which was recorded in 1971 by a French ethnomusicologist at the Solomon Islands near Papua New Guinea. The song, "Rorogwela" was sung by a young woman named Afunakwa. According to the video "Where the Hell is Afunakwa" by Matt Harding, Afunakwa died in 1998.

The video was passed around by e-mail and eventually became popular, with his server getting 20,000 or more hits a day as it was discovered, generally country by country due to language barriers, before the launch of major video upload sites.

Harding created a second version of the video in 2006, with additional dancing scenes from subsequent travels, called "Dancing 2006". At the request of Stride, a gum brand, he accepted sponsorship of this video, since he usually travels on a limited budget. Harding states:

"I went in very wary about working with a corporate sponsor but ... they didn’t want to make a commercial for their gum out of it. They’ve got commercials; you can see them on TV all the time. But they’d seen what was going on on the internet – and by that time YouTube had taken off and it was becoming a big deal … and a lot of companies they want to be a part of that. But it’s very very difficult, too, because as soon as a company gets in there and starts making things, we as viewers, a switch flicks in your head and you know you are watching an ad and you interpret it differently. So they said, ‘We want to help you make it, but we’re not making it.’"

The video, with more than 18 million views, shows Harding dancing for 3 to 7 seconds apiece in 36 locations mostly in front of distinct landmarks. The evident advertising only comes with two Stride logo watermarked scenes halfway into the video and a final credit. In August of 2008, Harding gave a talk at the Ignite conference in Seattle where he described how dancing by himself had become “boring” whereas dancing with others was far more interesting. For his newest video Harding had developed a listserv for every country from which he received an email, created a digital sign-up sheet for visit requests, and notified people when he would come to their country. Released on June 20, 2008, the third video is the product of 14 months of traveling in 42 countries. The background music/song of this video is known as "Praan" composed by Garry Schyman and sung by Palbasha Siddique, with lyrics adapted from the poem "Stream of Life," a part of the Gitanjali by Rabindranath Tagore. As well as the Youtube videos, a wide Visa advertising campaign appeared across 8 countries including in cinema advertising in 2008. This reached the wider public and confirmed the dancing video as a global phenomenon.

As of August 2008, Harding is represented by Creative Artists Agency. His videos are viewable on YouTube, Google Video, Vimeo and his own site wherethehellismatt.com. His "Where the Hell is Matt? (2008)" video has been watched over 43,700,000 times on YouTube since 2011 and Harding's YouTube channel is ranked "#83 - Most Subscribed (All Time) - Directors" as of December 22, 2010.

On June 20, 2012, 4 years after his third video, Harding released "Where the Hell is Matt? 2012". The video features Matt and many others dancing in 71 locations, comprising 55 countries and 11 US states. The video uses the song "Trip the Light", composed by Garry Schyman and sung by Alicia Lemke. The song was made available on iTunes, along with "Praan" and the song titled "Dance Outtakes Song" used in a video released on July 11, 2012, that features outtakes as well as locations which did not make the final video.

Drawing on the practice of Culture Jams, the Situationist International movement and the practices of incorporation and excorporation, Milstein and Pulos conclude that "while some of Harding’s videos are tied to corporate sponsorship, the arc of his projects also argues for the possibility of reorienting oneself with others to keep one step ahead of incorporation – even, ironically, while actively sponsored. This sense of possibility is essential in contemporary society as even not-for-profit public institutions – including universities and philanthropic organizations – seek out sponsorship from multinational corporations."

On November 2015, Harding launched a Kickstarter campaign to fund the making of a new video. Backers were allowed to vote on places where they would like him to go to for his new videos and he raised $146,075 out of a $125,000 goal. Via social media, he also broadcast the places where he would be dancing and invited netizens to participate in the making of his new video. By October 2016, he has finished his global dancing tour and is finalizing the edit of the video.

Major media coverage

Harding's video clips have appeared on television shows including:
 The Screen Savers (March 17, 2005)
 MSNBC's Countdown with Keith Olbermann (August 18, 2005)
 Inside Edition (August 19, 2005)
 The Ellen DeGeneres Show (October 10, 2005)
 Rude Tube (February 15, 2008)
 40 Greatest Internet Celebrities  on VH1
 Jimmy Kimmel Live! (August 6, 2008)
 Enough Rope (August 18, 2008)
 The Daily Show (November 6, 2008)
 Good Morning America (May 31, 2006)

In 2007, Jawed Karim, one of the founders of YouTube, stated that Harding's video was his favorite on YouTube at that time.

On July 22, 2008, and again on July 25, 2010, and July 10, 2012, and June 14, 2020, NASA featured Harding's videos on the APOD (Astronomy Picture of the Day) Web site. Text accompanying these videos, under the heading "Happy People Dancing on Planet Earth," claims that humans worldwide share a common love of dance, stating that "few people are able to watch the above video without smiling." Harding himself has joked that he is impressed by his appearances on APOD, especially since his videos have nothing to do with astronomy, nor are they pictures.

Hoax
On 11 December 2008, Matt Harding sarcastically "revealed" at the Entertainment Gathering that "everyone knows how easy it is to 'fake things' on the internet." According to this "confession," the videos were an elaborate hoax, Harding was not a game designer but rather an actor hired by a viral marketing New York ad agency, and the videos were made using animatronic puppets and extensive video editing. His presentation included a pie chart of supposed expenses, such as $1 million for “robot uprising insurance."  Harding’s hoax was lost on many when his talk was posted online, with a larger public perceiving the prank as an actual confession. A month after his presentation, criticism was so widespread that at the Macworld convention Harding revealed the "hoax about the hoax" and joked about the fact many people took it seriously. He explained he came up with the prankster idea when he himself felt duped by a viral video titled “Bike Hero,” which turned out to be a marketing campaign. He also made it very clear that the videos he made were indeed 100% real.

Videos
The titles in the five major videos are all titled Dancing without the year in the videos; Harding labels them as Where the Hell is Matt? (year) on YouTube.  The 2012 YouTube titles have also been titled Happy People Dancing on Planet Earth as well as Happy New Year! Peace on Earth in 2013.Dancing [2005]
Duration: 2:45  Dancing [2005]

 Beijing, China. July 2003
 Hanoi, Vietnam. May 2003
 Delhi, India. June 2003
 Spasskaya Tower & Saint Basil's Cathedral, Moscow, Russia. July–August 2003
 Soi Cowboy, Bangkok, Thailand.
 Taj Mahal, Agra, India.
 Charles Bridge, Prague, Czech Republic.
 Angkor Wat, Cambodia
 Bengal Jungle, India.
 Grauman's Chinese Theatre, Los Angeles, California. May 2004
 Suhbaatar, Mongolia.
 Kilimanjaro Summit, Tanzania. September 2004 
 Trans-Siberian Railway, Siberia, Russia.
 Monte Albán, Mexico.
 Tsavo, Kenya. 
 Impenetrable Forest, Uganda.
 Shwedagon Pagoda, Yangon, Myanmar.
 Home, Westport, Connecticut. August–October 2003
 Pike Place Market, Seattle, Washington.
 Times Square, New York, New York. August–October 2003

Dancing [2006]
Duration: 3:43  Dancing [2006]

 Salar de Uyuni, Bolivia. January 2006 
 Al Khazneh, Petra, Jordan.
 Machu Picchu, Peru. January 2006 
 Venice, Italy. May 2006 
 Tokyo, Japan. March 2006
 Galapagos Islands, Ecuador. 
 Brisbane, Australia.
 Luang Prabang, Laos.
 Bandar Seri Begawan, Brunei.
 Area 51, Nevada. August 2005
 Tikal, Guatemala.
 Half Moon Caye, Belize.
 Sossusvlei, Namibia.
 Routeburn Valley, New Zealand.
 Monument Valley, Arizona.
 South Shetland Islands.
 Chuuk, Federated States of Micronesia.
 St James's Palace, London, England. May 2006 
 Very Large Array, New Mexico. August 2005 
 Temple of Ramesses II, Abu Simbel, Egypt.
 Moai statues, Easter Island, Chile. February 2006
 Haute-Picardie, France.
 Library of Celsus, Ephesus, Turkey.
 Brooklyn Bridge, New York, New York. September 2005 
 Great Wall of China, Mutianyu, China.
 Guam.Matt journal post see June 23, 2008 on junked cars.
 Mokolodi, Botswana.
 Thierry Noir, East Side Gallery, Berlin, Germany.
 Sea Life Sydney Aquarium, Sydney, Australia.
 Ski Dubai, Dubai, United Arab Emirates.
 Jellyfish Lake, Rock Islands, Palau.
 Mulindi, Rwanda.
 Neko Harbour, Antarctica.
 Kjeragbolten, Norway.
 Golden Gate Bridge, San Francisco, California. Aug 2005
 Fremont Troll, Seattle, Washington.

Dancing Outtakes [2006]
"Here's some stuff that didn't make the final cut..."  Outtakes.  Duration 4:28  Dancing Outtakes [2006]

 #1 Kjeragbolten, Norway
 Los Angeles, California
 Nakun [sic Nakum], Guatemala
 Dead Vlei, Namibia  Should've gotten closer.
 Gulung [sic Gunung] Mulu, Malaysia  The jungles of Borneo. Could've done better.
 Tokyo, Japan  Got kicked out before I could get it right.
 Giza, Egypt  Pyramids.  Didn't quite do them justice.
 Singapore  Lame shot. Sorry, Singapore.
 #1 Chuuk, Micronesia  Dancing underwater is hard.
 Peterman [sic Petermann] Island, Antarctica  ...snow too.
 #1 Mulindi, Rwanda
 Haute-Picardie, France
 Rock Islands, Palau  Bad dancing... big shark.
 Grand Canyon, Arizona
 Mokolodi, Botswana  Tip: Get to know the elephants before you start dancing.
 Sea Life Sydney Aquarium, Sydney, Australia  A lot of folks think this is fake... ...nope.
 Salar de Uyuni, Bolivia  Neither is this.
 Routeburn Valley, New Zealand  Wedgie pick!
 #2 Chuuk, Micronesia Dancing on the ocean floor...  lesson learned.
 Easter Island, Chile  Phony tourist photo op? Why, yes. Yes, it is.
 Galápagos Islands, Ecuador  Marine iguanas...  they don't really do much.
 #2 Mulindi, Rwanda
 Cuverville Island, Antarctica  Penguins!  Too small.
 New York, New York
 Luang Prabang, Laos  ...umm... Li'l awkward.
 Sossusvlei, Namibia
 Redwood National Park, California  Do not look at the man-boobs. Ignore the man-boobs.
 Athens, Greece  Don't try dancing at the Parthenon.  They don't like it.
 #3 Mulindi, Rwanda
 Bellagio, Las Vegas, Nevada
 #2 Kjeragbolten, Norway  1000 meter drop.  Dumb.
 Fremont Troll, Seattle, Washington

Dancing [2008]
Duration: 4:29  Dancing [2008]

 Mumbai, India April 2008
 Paro Taktsang (The Tiger's Nest), Paro, Bhutan
 Giant's Causeway, Northern Ireland
 Stone Town, Zanzibar
 Lancelin, Western Australia, Australia
 Dune and Bulb Region, Lisse, Netherlands
 Christmas Island red crab, Christmas Island, Australia
 Kuwait Water Towers, Kuwait City, Kuwait
 Pyramid of the Sun, Teotihuacán, Mexico
 Seljalandsfoss, Iceland
(Quick scenes of transition from dancing alone to with others)  Dublin, Ireland
 Boston, Massachusetts
 Toronto, Ontario
 Atomium, Brussels, Belgium
 Praça do Comércio, Lisbon, Portugal
 Vancouver, British Columbia
 Alamo Square, San Francisco, California
 Eiffel Tower, Paris, France
 Melbourne, Victoria, Australia
 Senate Fountain, United States Capitol, Washington, D.C.
 Cloud Gate, Chicago, Illinois
 Plaza Mayor, Madrid, Spain
 Antseranana [sic Antsiranana], Madagascar
 Brisbane, Australia
 Saint Stephen's Green, Dublin, Ireland
 Caminito, La Boca, Buenos Aires, Argentina
 Chakachino [sic Mfuwe], Zambia
 Hagia Sophia, Istanbul, Turkey
 Wainivilase [sic Suva], Fiji
 National Gallery, London, England
 Sergels torg, Stockholm, Sweden
 Auki, Solomon Islands
 Sana'a, Yemen
 Ala Archa Gorge, Kyrgyzstan
 Tagaytay, Philippines
 Demilitarized Zone, Korea
 Timbuktu, Mali
 Sigismund's Column, Castle Square, Warsaw, Poland
 Stevie Ray Vaughan's memorial statue, Auditorium Shores, Austin, Texas
 Maid café, Tokyo, Japan
 Huli people, Poria [sic Tari], Papua New Guinea
 Miami, Florida
 Monopteros, Englischer Garten, Munich, Germany
 Tongatapu, Tonga
 Cloud Gate, Chicago, Illinois Sept 2007
 Thimphu, Bhutan
 Gurgaon, India
 Sydney Opera House, Sydney, Australia
 Statue of Joseph I, Praça do Comércio Lisbon, Portugal
 Namdaemun gate, Seoul, South Korea
 Soweto, South Africa
 Bethesda Terrace, New York, New York.
 Tokyo, Japan
 Humpback whale, Vava'u, Tonga
 Cape of Good Hope, South Africa
 Container ship, Panama Canal, Panama
 Wadi Rum, Jordan
 Lemur Island, Madagascar
 Albert Park, Auckland, New Zealand
 Batik [sic Aït Benhaddou], Morocco
 Statue of Multatuli, Torensluis bridge, Singel canal, Amsterdam, Netherlands
 Fountain of Rings, Centennial Olympic Park, Atlanta, Georgia
 National Palace, Zócalo, Mexico City, Mexico
 Brussels, Belgium
 Alamo Square, San Francisco, California
 Taipei, Taiwan
 Inuksuk, English Bay, Vancouver, British Columbia
 Senate Fountain, United States Capitol, Washington, D.C.
 Rio de Janeiro, Brazil
 Cologne Cathedral, Cologne, Germany
 Merlion Park, Singapore
 String section, Alhambra, California Garry Schyman music notes
 Fire and Water Fountain, Tel Aviv, Israel
 East Jerusalem, West Bank
 Eiffel Tower, Paris, France
 Montreal, Quebec
 Reduced gravity aircraft (ZERO-G), Nellis Airspace, Nevada
 Pacific Park, Los Angeles, California
 Monument to the Independence of Brazil, São Paulo, Brazil
 Gas Works Park, Seattle, Washington

Dancing in South Africa [2010]
Website title: Where the Hell is Matt in South Africa. In preparation for the 2010 FIFA World Cup, Matt Harding created a special video to celebrate the occasion in which he performed the Diski Dance in locations across South Africa. He uploaded the video to YouTube on March 5, 2010. The following locations were shown in the video in the order listed. Some locations were visited several times.  Duration: 1:40  Dancing in South Africa [2010]

 Nelson Mandela Square, Sandton, Johannesburg
 The Pinnacle, Blyde River Canyon, Mpumalanga
 Hout Bay, Cape Town
 Table Mountain, Cape Town
 Cape Town Stadium, Cape Town
 Mbombela Stadium, Nelspruit
 South African Airways
 Boulders Beach, near Cape Town
 Soweto Cooling Towers, Soweto. Johannesburg
 Robben Island
 Soccer City, Soweto, Johannesburg
 Table Mountain, Cape Town
 Cape of Good Hope
 Camp Jabulani, Hoedspruit
 Blyde River Canyon, Mpumalanga
 Nelson Mandela Square, Sandton, Johannesburg
 Bourke's Luck Potholes,  Blyde River Canyon, Mpumalanga
 Soweto Cooling Towers, Soweto. Johannesburg
 Hout Bay, Cape Town
 Nelson Mandela Square, Sandton, Johannesburg
 Mac Mac Pools, near Mac-Mac Falls, Mpumalanga
 Lesedi Cultural Village, near Johannesburg
 Camp Jabulani, Hoedspruit
 Bourke's Luck Potholes,  Blyde River Canyon, Mpumalanga
 Lesedi Cultural Village, near Johannesburg
 Soccer City, Soweto, Johannesburg
 Table Mountain, Cape Town
 Johannesburg
 Boulders Beach, near Cape Town
 The Pinnacle, Blyde River Canyon, Mpumalanga
 Nelson Mandela Square, Sandton, Johannesburg
 Soccer City, Soweto, Johannesburg
 South African Airways

Dancing [2012]
The fifth video was released on 20 June 2012. In 2012 Matt works with other dancers, sometimes using a local dance or another dance step. Duration: 4:53  Dancing [2012]

Note: 13 cities have 2 segments. #1 & #2 on left side of city means same location; #1 & #2 on right side of city means different locations in the city.

Prelude
 #1 Kigali, Rwanda
 Fountain Giralda, Seville, Spain
  Ballroom #1 Vienna, Austria
 Cheerleading #1, Penn State Schuylkill, Schuyhill Haven  [sic Schuylkill Haven, Pennsylvania
 Dance studio #1 Damascus, Syria The dancers are blurred for their safety. 2011–2012 Damascus clashes
 Huli people #1, Poria [sic Tari], Papua New Guinea Matt journal post
 lobby, Pyongyang, North Korea #1
 opening dance of West Side Story, Martyrs' Square, Beirut, Lebanon
 Agora #1, Athens Olympic Sports Complex, Athens, Greece
 Lesedi Cultural Village, Lesedi, South Africa
 Yaowawit School, Kapong, Thailand
  Parque del Este, Caracas, Venezuela
  Dance in Indonesia, Bali, Indonesia
 Fire Drill Field, League City, Texas
 Scuba diving, Great Barrier Reef, Cairns, Australia
 Shuffle Off to Buffalo, Al-Muzahmiyya, Saudi Arabia Behind the Dancing Matt Videos
 AXIS Dance Company, Oakland, California #1
 Horace E. Dodge Fountain, Hart Plaza, Detroit, Michigan
 Mongolian horse, Terelj, Mongolia
 Music of the Maldives, Rangali Island, Maldives
 Dance in Zimbabwe, Ruwa, Zimbabwe
 Elisabeth Bridge, Budapest, Hungary #1
 Port-au-Prince, Haiti
 Robot (dance), Erbil, Iraq I found Matt
 Fire dancing, Polynesian Village Luau, Kihei, Maui, Hawaii
 City Park, New Orleans, Louisiana
 Jeepney, University of the Philippines Diliman, Quezon City, Philippines
 Cheerleading #2, Penn State Schuylkill, Schuyhill Haven [sic Schuylkill Haven, Pennsylvania
 Dance studio #2, Damascus, Syria The dancers are blurred for their safety. 2011–2012 Damascus clashes
 Afghan Mobile Mini Children's Circus, Kabul, Afghanistan
 Alegría (Cirque du Soleil), Saint François de Paule church at Place Louis Blanc and Cours Lafayette, Toulon, France
  Waltz, Ballroom #2, Vienna, Austria
 Chinese New Year, Beijing, China Matt journal post
Salsa (dance), Jaffa Gate near Tower of David, Jerusalem
 Mass Dances, Pyongyang, North Korea #2 Matt Reddit excerpt
 Himba people, Opuwo, Namibia
 Capilla del Cristo, San Juan, Puerto Rico
 children Ballet, Belgrade, Serbia
 Bronco Stadium, Boise, Idaho
 Scottish highland dance, St Anthony's Chapel, Holyrood Park, Edinburgh, Scotland, United Kingdom
 Rocky Steps,  Philadelphia, Pennsylvania
 Robben Island, South Africa
 Fountain, Trinity Square, Toronto, Canada
 Frauenkirche #1, Dresden, Germany
 Place Bellecour, Lyon, France
 F/A-18 Hornet, USS Abraham Lincoln, Pacific Ocean (Colored jersey guide),  Nat'l Geo behind scenes, Mayhem Weekend on the USS Abraham Lincoln AirCraft Carrier, flight deck signals
 Willams Waterwall, Houston, Texas
 Old Town Main Square, Bratislava, Slovakia
 Graffiti - tekno in the light, Hosier Lane,  Melbourne, Australia
 Tahrir Square, Cairo, Egypt #1
 Kowloon Public Pier south of Clock Tower, Hong Kong, China
 southern tower Viru Gates east of Town Hall Square, Tallinn, Estonia
 Sibelius Monument,  Helsinki, Finland
 Fushimi Inari-taisha Shrine,  Kyoto, Japan
 Free Stamp, Willard Park, Cleveland, Ohio
 Kalafasia [sic Honiara], Solomon Islands Matt journal post
 Plaza de la Luz (Plaza Cisneros), Medellin, Colombia
 Hitch hike (dance), Huli people #2, Poria [sic Tari], Papua New Guinea
 Museu Nacional d'Art de Catalunya, Barcelona, Spain
 The Poznań Celebration, Queen Victoria Monument, Piccadilly Gardens, Manchester, England, United Kingdom
 Jehangir Kothari Parade, Karachi, Pakistan
 Parterre of Ledeburg Palace, Prague, Czech Republic WtHiM in Prague WtHiM Prague
 Agora #2, Athens Olympic Sports Complex, Athens, Greece
 Qasr al-Nil Bridge(?), Cairo, Egypt #2
 Polyterrace of ETH Zurich, Zurich, Switzerland
 Frauenkirche #2, Dresden, Germany
 Piazza del Popolo #1, Rome, Italy
 National Theatre, San Jose, Costa Rica #1
 Stephen I statue, Fisherman's Bastion, Budapest, Hungary #2
 near Piazza del Duomo, Milan, Italy
 UNRWA's Summer Games, Rafah, Gaza Strip
 Taoyuan City, Taiwan
 Carnival, Port of Spain, Trinidad Trinidad Carnival Diary
 Stata Center, MIT, Cambridge, Massachusetts
 Friendship of Nations fountain,  All-Russia Exhibition Centre, Moscow, Russia
 Clyde, California sea lion, SeaWorld, San Diego, California
 Piazza del Popolo #2, Rome, Italy
 Baltimore Crab Dance, Pagoda, Patterson Park, Baltimore, Maryland  Welcome Matt
 Baile Folklorico, San Jose, Costa Rica #2
 The Dancers, Denver Performing Arts Complex, Denver, Colorado
 Winter Palace, St. Petersburg, Russia
 Gazebo, Lake Merritt, Oakland, California #2
 #2 Kigali, Rwanda
 Nuclear family, Home, Seattle, Washington

Dancing Outtakes [2012]

"I always shoot more than I can use.  Here's some stuff that didn't make it in."  Outtakes.  Duration 3:45  Dancing Outtakes [2012]

Hotel del Coronado, San Diego, California
Al-Muzahmiyya, Saudi Arabia
Market House, Fayetteville, North Carolina
Waimea Bay, Hawaii
Gigantor statue, Wakamatsu Park, Kobe, Japan
Elephantstay, Royal Elephant Kraal & Village, Ayutthaya, Thailand
Royal Shakespeare Theatre, Stratford-upon-Avon, England September 2011
Pioneer Plaza, Dallas, Texas
Parthenon, Centennial Park, Nashville, Tennessee
Science and Technology Museum, Shanghai, China
National Monument of Scotland, Edinburgh, Scotland
Hula, Maui, HawaiiFree Stamp, Willard Park, Cleveland, Ohio
Parque del Este, Caracas, Venezuela
Hong Kong Island skyline viewed from Kowloon Public Pier, Hong Kong, China
The Great Salt Lake, Utah
ASIMO, Tokyo, Japan
Jewish dance, New York, New York
AXIS Dance Company, Oakland, California
Djabugay people, Caravonica, Australia
Memorial Union Terrace, Madison, Wisconsin
Sheep Meadow, Central Park, New York, New York
Fuji Television headquarters, Odaiba, Tokyo, Japan
Fountain Hills, Phoenix, Arizona
Statue of the Victor, Belgrade Fortress, Belgrade, SerbiaFriendship of Nations fountain,  All-Russia Exhibition Centre, Moscow, Russia
Clown, Erbil, Iraq
?near Federation Square, Melbourne, Australia
Sanlitun SOHO, Beijing, China
Nuclear family, Home, Seattle, Washington
Berlin, Germany
Huli people, Poria [sic Tari], Papua New Guinea
Tom McCall Waterfront Park, Portland, Oregon
Polyterrace of ETH Zurich, Zurich, Switzerland
Lesedi Cultural Village, Lesedi, South Africa
Taoyuan City, Taiwan
Clyde, California sea lion, SeaWorld, San Diego, California
Carnival, Port of Spain, Trinidad Trinidad Carnival Diary
Piazza del Popolo, Rome, Italy
Watts Towers, Los Angeles, CaliforniaSpoonbridge and Cherry'', Minneapolis Sculpture Garden, Minneapolis, Minnesota July 2011
Islands Brygge, Copenhagen, Denmark
Cairo, Egypt
Fountain Giralda, Seville, Spain
Erbil, Iraq
Afghan Mobile Mini Children's Circus, Kabul, Afghanistan
Lesedi Cultural Village, Lesedi, South Africa
Fire dancing, Polynesian Village Luau, Kihei, Maui, Hawaii

Dancing [2016]

 Matanzas, Cuba
 Dhaka, Bangladesh
 Seattle, Washington
 Philadelphia, Pennsylvania
 London, England
 Amarapura, Myanmar
 Almaty, Kazakhstan
 Las Vegas, Nevada
 Leeds, England
 Al Amarat, Oman
 Arlington, Virginia
 Columbus, Ohio
 Portland, Oregon
 Zaandam, Netherlands
 Los Angeles, California
 Dubai, United Arab Emirates
 Boston, Massachusetts
 Bagan, Myanmar
 Paris, France
 Dubai, United Arab Emirates
 Colorado springs, Colorado
 Cienfuegos, Cuba
 Chicago, Illinois
 Stanford, California
 Denver, Colorado
 Toronto, Ontario
 Brooklyn, New York
 Addis Ababa, Ethiopia
 Brookline, Massachusetts
 Huntington Beach, California
 Orlando, Florida
 Hamburg, Germany
 London, England
 Queens, New York
 Las Vegas, Nevada
 Kraków, Poland
 Muscat, Oman
 Rzeszów, Poland
 Cape Town, South Africa
 Boulder, Colorado
 Hamburg, Germany
 Dhaka, Bangladesh
 Matanzas, Cuba
 Medie, Ghana
 Düsseldorf, Germany
 Dublin, Ohio
 Kraków, Poland
 Washington, D.C.
 Almaty, Kazakhstan
 Inglewood, California
 Chicago, Illinois
 Vancouver, Canada

References

External links
 Official homepage and blog

Viral videos